Jude Francois, (born March 7, 1995), better known by his stage name Jay Burna, is a Haitian American rapper. Jay is best known for his hit singles "Ready", "Mood", and "Mine All Mine". Jay has also worked with artists and producers such as T.I, Kid Ink, Khalil (singer), Sammie, Trina, Fetty Wap, Currensy, Jerry Wonda, and Wyclef Jean .

Early life
Francois was born on March 7, 1995, in Los Angeles, California to Haitian parents Dieudonne Francois and Antoinette Francois at the Harbor-UCLA Medical Center. Jay is the oldest of his three siblings. Jay's father Dieudonne introduced him to music at the age of four, especially Marvin Gaye and Zapp & Roger. Jay started showcasing his talent by freestyling for his peers in school. Jay then moved to Fort Lauderdale, Florida, where he resides today.

Career
Jay released his debut hit single "Ready", which has been featured on MTV and VH1. Jay then released another hit single "Mood", which premiered on the front page of Vibe. Jay founded and operates Black Congress Music Group, an independent label.

Discography

Singles
 Jay Burna – Ready
 Jay Burna – Mood – charted at No. 119 on urban radio and No. 19 on the indie label charts
 Jay Burna – Change the Game – over 1 million streams on Spotify and reached select streaming charts
 Jay Burna – Melrose – amassed 3 million plus streams on Soundcloud. Named after his hometown neighborhood in Broward County, FL
 Jay Burna – Mine All Mine – amassed Three million plus streams on all platforms.
 Jay Burna—Game Time Featuring Trina
 Jay Burna—Jamaica With Fetty Wap Featuring Daniel Skye
 Jay Burna—Life of The Party 
 Jay Burna - U the Sh*t Featuring T.I.

EPs

Mixtapes

References

1995 births
Living people